Perdu d'avance is the debut studio album by French rapper Orelsan. It was released on 16 February 2009 by 3e Bureau and 7th Magnitude. It peaked at number 20 on the French Albums Chart, and was certified platinum by the SNEP, selling more than 100,000 copies in France. It was also nominated for a Prix Constantin award.

Track listing
All songs written by Aurélien Cotentin and produced by Skread.

Notes
 "Pour le pire" features vocals by Nadia.
 "Gros poissons dans une petite mare" features vocals by Keina.

Personnel
Credits for Perdu d'avance adapted from Discogs.

 123 Klan – Artwork
 Benjamin Brard – Artwork
 Jean-Pierre Chalbos – Mastering
 Véronica Ferraro – Mixing
 Gringe – Featured artist
 Keina – Vocals
 Manuel Lagos Cid – Photography
 Nadia – Vocals
 Orelsan – Primary artist
 Skread – Producer, recording
 Ron "Bumblefoot" Thal – Guitar, featured artist

Chart performance
The album sold more than  100,000 copies in France.

Certifications

References

2009 debut albums
Orelsan albums
French-language albums
7th Magnitude albums
Albums produced by Skread